Lake Patterson is a lake in Carver County, Minnesota, in the United States.

Lake Patterson was named for William Patterson, a pioneer settler.

References

Lakes of Minnesota
Lakes of Carver County, Minnesota